Luis Enrique "Tite" Arroyo, (February 18, 1927 – January 13, 2016) was a Major League Baseball pitcher from 1955 to 1963.

Baseball career
Arroyo, from Peñuelas, Puerto Rico, made his MLB debut on April 20, 1955. A stocky left-hander, he spent one season primarily as a starter with the St. Louis Cardinals. Though he was a member of the National League All-Star team that year, he was traded to the Pittsburgh Pirates the next spring, where he was moved to the bullpen. Struggling to establish himself in the role, he went from the Pirates to the Cincinnati Redlegs, then the New York Yankees. Arroyo was the first to play for the Yankees, and despite his earlier struggles, he quickly became an important contributor to the club.

American League hitters had little success against Arroyo's screwball, and after a solid contribution at the back of their bullpen in 1960, he enjoyed the best season of his career in 1961. That year, Arroyo pitched 119 innings with a 2.19 ERA, while winning 15 games as the team's relief ace. His totals of 65 games pitched and 29 saves both led the league, he surrendered only five home runs in a season where league-wide offensive totals were very high by historical standards, and was named to his second All-Star team while finishing sixth in AL MVP voting.

Arroyo's glory was, however, short-lived. He injured his arm the following spring; while he pitched for two more seasons, he never regained his prior effectiveness. Arroyo retired after appearing in only six innings in the 1963 season. Over the course of his MLB career, he pitched 531 innings with a 3.93 ERA, collecting 40 wins, 32 losses, and 44 saves.

Following his retirement as a player, Arroyo became a scout and pitching coach for the Yankees.

Legacy and death
In an article in 1976 in Esquire magazine, sportswriter Harry Stein published an "All Time All-Star Argument Starter", consisting of five ethnic baseball teams. Arroyo, a Puerto Rican, was the relief pitcher on Stein's Latin team.

On July 16, 2010, Arroyo was hospitalized after suffering a "mild heart attack"; he fell ill at an event leading up to the Yankees' July 17 Old-Timers' Day celebration, an annual event where Arroyo was a popular figure.

Arroyo died on January 13, 2016, in Ponce, Puerto Rico. The Yankees announced his death saying that Arroyo's daughter said he had been diagnosed with cancer in December 2015.

See also

 List of Major League Baseball players from Puerto Rico
List of Puerto Ricans
List of Major League Baseball annual saves leaders

References

External links

1927 births
2016 deaths
American League All-Stars
Cincinnati Redlegs players
Columbus Jets players
Columbus Red Birds players
Criollos de Caguas players
Deaths from cancer in Puerto Rico
Greensboro Patriots players
Greenville Greenies players
Havana Sugar Kings players
Hollywood Stars players
Houston Buffaloes players
Jersey City Jerseys players
Liga de Béisbol Profesional Roberto Clemente pitchers
Major League Baseball pitchers
Major League Baseball players from Puerto Rico
Minor league baseball managers
National League All-Stars
New York Yankees players
New York Yankees scouts
Omaha Cardinals players
People from Peñuelas, Puerto Rico
Pittsburgh Pirates players
Richmond Virginians (minor league) players
Rochester Red Wings players
St. Louis Cardinals players
Screwball pitchers
Senadores de San Juan players
Puerto Rican expatriate baseball players in Cuba